Isonychus is a genus of May beetles and junebugs in the family Scarabaeidae. There are more than 140 described species in Isonychus.

See also
 List of Isonychus species

References

Further reading

 
 
 
 
 

Melolonthinae
Articles created by Qbugbot